Chameleon 3: Dark Angel is a 2000 American television-science fiction film. It was directed by John Lafia and started Bobbie Phillips as Kam. The film is a sequel to Chameleon and Chameleon II: Death Match.

Plot
In the third and last film of the trilogy, Kam, a genetically engineered agent, attempts to thwart the plans of her evil twin brother.

Cast
 Bobbie Phillips as Kam
 Teal Redmann as Dr. Tess Adkins
 Alex Kuzelicki as Kane
 Doug Penty as Ben Merrit, Kam's Handler for IBI
 Suzi Dougherty as Victoria, IBI Shrink
 Jonathan Stuart as Jeremy Callow, IBI Med Tech

Reception
Robert Pardi from TV Guide gave film five out of five stars: "Fans of the CHAMELEON franchise won't be disappointed by this second sequel, which chronicles the further adventures of a DNA-improved policewoman of the future who's part falcon, part chameleon, part coyote and all fox!".

See also
 List of television films produced for UPN

Notes

External links
 
 
 
 "Chameleon" at Girls With Guns
 

2000 films
2000 television films
2000 science fiction action films
2000s American films
2000s English-language films
Action television films
American science fiction action films
American science fiction television films
American sequel films
Films directed by John Lafia
Films scored by Joel Goldsmith
Television sequel films
UPN original films